Charles I (Charles Martin; ; ; 10 November 1433 – 5 January 1477), nicknamed the Bold (German: der Kühne; Dutch: de Stoute), was Duke of Burgundy from 1467 to 1477.

Charles's main objective was to be crowned king by turning the growing Burgundian State into a territorially continuous kingdom. He declared himself and his lands independent, bought Upper Alsace and conquered Zutphen, Guelders and Lorraine, uniting at last Burgundian northern and southern possessions. This caused the enmity of several European powers and triggered the Burgundian Wars.

Charles's early death at the Battle of Nancy at the hands of Swiss mercenaries fighting for René II, Duke of Lorraine, was of great consequence in European history. The Burgundian domains, long wedged between the Kingdom of France and the Habsburg Empire, were divided, but the precise disposition of the vast and disparate territorial possessions involved was disputed among the European powers for centuries.

Biography

Early life

Charles the Bold was born in Dijon, the son of Philip the Good and Isabella of Portugal. Before the death of his father in 1467, he bore the title of Count of Charolais; afterwards, he assumed all of his father's titles, including that of "Grand Duke of the West". He was also made a Knight of the Golden Fleece just twenty days after his birth, invested by Charles I, Count of Nevers, and the seigneur de Croÿ.

Charles was brought up under the direction of Jean d'Auxy and early showed great application alike to academic studies and warlike exercises. His father's court was the most extravagant in Europe at the time, and a centre for the arts and commerce. While he was growing up, Charles witnessed his father's efforts to unite his far-flung and ethnically diverse dominions into a single state, and his own later efforts centered on continuing and securing his father's successes in this endeavor.

In 1440, at the age of seven, Charles was married to Catherine, daughter of King Charles VII of France and sister of the Dauphin (later King Louis XI). She was five years older than her husband, and she died in 1446 at the age of 18. They had no children.

In 1454, at the age of 21, Charles married a second time. He wanted to marry a daughter of his distant cousin Richard Plantagenet, 3rd Duke of York (a sister of Kings Edward IV and Richard III of England), but under terms of the Treaty of Arras of 1435, he was required to marry a French princess. His father chose Isabella of Bourbon, who was several years younger than him and was the daughter of Philip the Good's sister Agnes and a very distant cousin of Charles VII of France. She died in 1465 and their daughter, Mary, was Charles's only surviving child.

Charles was on friendly terms with his brother-in-law Louis, the Dauphin of France, who had been a refugee at the court of Burgundy from 1456 until he succeeded his father as king of France in 1461. But Louis began to pursue some of the same policies as his father, for example Louis's later repurchase of the towns on the Somme River that Louis's father had ceded in 1435 to Charles's father in the Treaty of Arras, which Charles viewed with chagrin. When his father's failing health enabled him to assume the reins of government (which Philip relinquished to him by an act of 12 April 1465), he initiated a policy of hostility toward Louis XI that led to the Burgundian Wars, and he became one of the principal leaders of the League of the Public Weal, an alliance of west European nobles opposed to policies of Louis XI that sought to centralize the royal authority within France.

For his third wife, Charles was offered the hand of Louis XI's daughter Anne. The wife he ultimately chose, however, was his second cousin Margaret of York (who was also, like himself, a great-grandchild of John of Gaunt). Upon the death of his father in 1467, Charles was no longer bound by the terms of the Treaty of Arras, and he decided to ally himself with Burgundy's old ally England. Louis did his best to prevent or delay the marriage with Margaret (he even sent French ships to waylay her as she sailed to Sluys), but in the summer of 1468, it was celebrated sumptuously at Bruges, and Charles was made a Knight of the Garter. The couple had no children, but Margaret devoted herself to her stepdaughter Mary. After Mary's death in 1482, she kept Mary's two infant children, Philip the Fair and Margaret of Austria, as long as she was allowed.

Early battles
On 12 April 1465, Philip relinquished control of the government of his domains to Charles, who spent the next summer prosecuting the War of the Public Weal against Louis XI. Charles was left master of the field at the Battle of Montlhéry on 13 July 1465, but this neither prevented the king from re-entering Paris nor did it assure Charles of a decisive victory. He succeeded, however, in forcing upon Louis the Treaty of Conflans of 4 October 1465, by which the king restored to him certain towns on the Somme River, the counties of Boulogne and Guînes, and various other small territories. During the negotiations for the treaty, his wife Isabella died suddenly at Les Quesnoy on 25 September, making a political marriage suddenly possible. As part of the treaty, Louis promised him the hand of his infant daughter Anne, with the territories of Champagne and Ponthieu as a dowry, but no marriage ever took place. In the meanwhile, Charles obtained the surrender of Ponthieu.

Charles's concentration on the affairs of France was diverted by the Revolt of Liège against his father and the bishop of Liège (Louis of Bourbon) and a desire to punish the town of Dinant in the province of Namur. During the wars of the summer of 1465, Dinant celebrated a false rumour that Charles had been defeated at Montlhéry by burning him in effigy and chanting that he was the bastard child of his mother Isabella of Portugal and John of Heinsburg, the previous Bishop of Liège (d. 1455). On 25 August 1466, Charles marched into Dinant, determined to avenge this slur on the honour of his mother, and sacked the city, killing every man, woman and child within. After the death of Charles's father Philip the Good in 1467, the Bishopric of Liège renewed hostilities, but was defeated by Charles at the Battle of Brustem. Charles made a victorious entry into Liège, dismantled its walls and stripped the city of some of its privileges.

Treaty of Péronne

Alarmed by the early successes of the new Duke of Burgundy and anxious to settle various questions relating to the execution of the Treaty of Conflans, Louis XI requested a meeting with Charles and daringly placed himself in his hands in the town of Péronne in Picardy in October 1468. In the course of the negotiations, the duke was informed of a fresh revolt of the Bishopric of Liège secretly fomented by Louis as part of the Liège Wars. After deliberating for four days on the best way to deal with his adversary, who had foolishly placed himself at his mercy, Charles decided to respect the promise he had given to guarantee Louis's safety and to negotiate with him. At the same time, he forced Louis to assist him in quelling the revolt in Liège. The town was captured and many inhabitants were massacred. Louis chose not to intervene on behalf of his former allies.

At the expiry of the one year's truce that followed the Treaty of Péronne, the French king accused Charles of treason, cited him to appear before the parlement, and seized some of the towns on the Somme in 1471. The duke retaliated by invading France with a large army; he took possession of Nesle and massacred its inhabitants. He failed, however, in an attack on Beauvais and had to content himself with laying waste to the countryside as far as Rouen. He eventually withdrew without attaining any useful result.

Domestic policies
Charles pursued domestic policies that assisted the growth of his military establishment. To this end, he relinquished at least some of the extravagance that had characterized the court of Burgundy under his father, if not the magnificence of ceremonial events. From the beginning of his reign, he  employed himself in reorganizing his army and the administration of his territories. While retaining the principles of feudal recruiting, he endeavored to establish a system of rigid discipline among his troops that was strengthened by the employment of foreign mercenaries, particularly Englishmen and Italians, and the augmentation of his artillery. The economic power that Charles inherited from Philip led to an independent judicial system, a sophisticated administration, and the establishment of local estates.

Building a kingdom
Charles constantly sought to expand the territories under his control. In 1469, Archduke Sigismund of Austria sold him the county of Ferrette, the Landgraviate of Alsace, and some other towns, reserving to himself the right to repurchase.

In 1472–1473, Charles bought the reversion of the Duchy of Guelders (i.e. the right to succeed to it) from its duke Arnold, whom he had supported against the rebellion of his son. Not content with being "the Grand Duke of the West," he conceived the project of forming a kingdom of Burgundy or Arles with himself as independent sovereign and even persuaded the Holy Roman Emperor Frederick III to assent to crown him a king at Trier. The ceremony, however, did not take place owing to the emperor's precipitate flight by night in September 1473, which was occasioned by his displeasure at the duke's ambitions and demeanor.

At the close of 1473, the Burgundian State went from Charolais in France to the edges of the Netherlands. This made Charles the Bold one of the wealthiest and most powerful nobles in Europe. Indeed, his landholdings and revenue base rivalled those of many of the royal families.

Downfall

In 1474, Charles began to involve himself in the series of political struggles that ultimately brought about his downfall. He first came into conflict with the Archduke Sigismund of Austria, to whom he refused to restore his possessions in Alsace for the stipulated sum. Then, he quarreled with the Swiss, who supported the free towns in the Upper Rhine in their revolt against the tyranny of the ducal governor Peter von Hagenbach (who was condemned by a special international tribunal and executed on 9 May 1474). Finally, he antagonized René II, Duke of Lorraine, with whom he disputed the succession in the Duchy of Lorraine, which bordered many of his territories. All of these enemies readily joined forces against their common adversary Charles.

Charles suffered a first rebuff in endeavouring to protect his kinsman Ruprecht of the Palatinate, Archbishop of Cologne, against his rebel subjects. He spent ten months (July 1474 – June 1475) besieging the little town of Neuss on the Rhine (the Siege of Neuss), but was compelled by the approach of a powerful imperial army to raise the siege. Moreover, the expedition he had persuaded his brother-in-law Edward IV of England to undertake against Louis XI was stopped by the Treaty of Picquigny of 29 August 1475. He was more successful in Lorraine, where he seized Nancy on 30 November 1475.

From Nancy he marched against the Swiss. He saw fit to hang or drown the garrison of Grandson after its capitulation. Grandson was a possession of Jacques of Savoy, Count of Romont, a close ally of Charles, that had been captured recently by the forces of the Swiss Confederacy. Some days later, on 2 March 1476, Charles was attacked outside the village of Concise by the confederate army in the Battle of Grandson and suffered a defeat; he was compelled to flee with a handful of attendants and abandon his artillery along with an immense booty, including his silver bath and the crown jewel called The Three Brothers commissioned by his grandfather Duke John the Fearless.

Charles succeeded in raising a fresh army of 30,000 men that he used to fight the Battle of Morat on 22 June 1476. He was again defeated by the Swiss army, which was assisted by the cavalry of the Duke of Lorraine. On this occasion, unlike the debacle at Grandson, little booty was lost, but Charles did lose about one third of his entire army. The defeated soldiers were pushed into the nearby lake, where they were drowned or shot at while trying to swim to safety on the opposite shore. On 6 October, Charles lost Nancy, which the Duke of Lorraine was able to recover.

Death at Nancy
Making a last effort, Charles formed a new army and arrived in the dead of winter before the walls of Nancy. Having lost many of his troops through the severe cold, it was with only a few thousand men that he met the joint forces of the Lorrainers and the Swiss, who had come to the relief of the town.

After the battle, the Duke of Lorraine sent messengers to discover what happened to Charles. A day later, a page reported that he had seen Charles die. About a dozen bodies were found by the edge of a pool, many of them followers and close friends of Charles. Although all the bodies had been stripped naked, some were recognizable, among them Charles, whose body was in a worse condition a short distance away. One cheek had been chewed away by wolves and the other embedded in frozen slime. Removing the body from the frozen water required fetching instruments from Nancy.

Charles's body bore evidence of a blow above the ear from a halberd and spear wounds through the thighs and abdomen. Canvassing Charles's physician, chaplain, pages, and others, it was established that the corpse was Charles based on missing teeth, a scar matching a wound Charles had received in a battle at Montl'héry, a shoulder wound, his long finger nails, and a fistula on the groin.

Charles's battered body was initially buried in the ducal church in Nancy, by René II, Duke of Lorraine. Later in 1550, his great-grandson, Holy Roman Emperor Charles V, ordered it to be moved to the Church of Our Lady in Bruges, next to that of his daughter Mary. In 1562, Emperor Charles V's son and heir, King Philip II of Spain, erected a mausoleum in early renaissance style over his tomb, which is still extant. Excavations in 1979 positively identified the remains of Mary, in a lead coffin, but those of Charles were never found.

Marriages and family
Charles married three times:

 On 19 May 1440, he married Catherine of France (1428–1446), daughter of Charles VII of France and Marie of Anjou. She died in 1446.
 On 30 October 1454, he married Isabella of Bourbon (1437–1465), daughter of Charles I of Bourbon. He had wanted to marry Anne of York (the daughter of Richard, Duke of York), but his father insisted that he fulfill the conditions of the Treaty of Arras (1435), which committed him to marry a French princess. The marriage was, however, a happy one, and produced his only child, Mary of Burgundy, on 13 February 1457.
 On 3 July 1468, Charles married Anne's sister, Margaret of York (1446–1503); her siblings also included Edward IV of England, George, Duke of Clarence, and Richard III of England. The marriage was solemnized at Damme, near Bruges, by the bishop of Salisbury.

The Burgundian possessions became part of the Habsburg empire on the marriage of his daughter Mary to Maximilian I, Holy Roman Emperor.

Nickname
Burgundian chroniclers described the personality of the duke as austere, virtuous but without pity, pious and chaste, and with a great sense of honour. His contemporaries named him le Hardi or der Kühne ("the Bold") or le Guerrier ("the Warrior") or le Terrible ("the Terrible"), among others, and the epithet that became his byname in history, le Téméraire ("the Reckless"), is already found in Thomas Basin, bishop of Lisieux, who wrote around 1484.
In the 15th century these bynames were used simply as qualifications of his character, and the duke being simply known as Charles de Bourgogne.

The process of the epithet le Téméraire acquiring the nature of a byname was gradual. In the 17th century, the Grand Dictionnaire Historique of Louis Moreri mentions Charles de Bourgogne, surnommé le Guerrier, le Hardi ou le Téméraire.
In the 18th century, Dom Plancher still mentions him as Charles le Hardi.
In the 19th century, the byname of le Téméraire became standard in France and Belgium.

Legacy

In a recent influential work, Le Royaume inachevé des ducs de Bourgogne (XIVe–XVe siècles) (translated into English as The Illusion of the Burgundian State), Élodie Lecuppre-Desjardin argues that the Burgundian state (or states) lacked a common sense of Burgundian identity. The early dukes considered themselves "children of France" and consolidated their Burgundian lands to strengthen their position within the Kingdom of France. Charles the Bold detached himself from France, but cultivated a government modeled on that of the latter. Moreover, he contributed to the lack of a common identity by failing in his role as a prince who should have inspired both love and fear
Notable Belgian historians like Cauchies and Dumont recognize that the work has merits, but criticize the overemphasis on events (perceived as failure) under Charles the Bold regarding the state building project of the Burgundian rulers. Jean-Marie Cauchies writes:
The red thread, reflected in the title by the word 'unfinished', is that of a failure, due essentially to a lack of political foresight. What can one think about it? Yes, Burgundy (ie. the Duchy), the "cradle" of the dynasty, was lost forever in 1477. No, the territorial connection between northern and southern possessions could not be formed under Duke Charles, a prince to whom we must recognize – and the author does – the concern and the ability to create plans... But, were it through fifteen years of tribulations, under the leadership of Mary and Maximilian and then of Maximilian alone, a consortium of territories nevertheless emerged which found its place in the West under the heirs, Philippe le Beau and Charles Quint. Failed "kingdom"? Certainly the dukes of Burgundy would have enjoyed wearing the crown – and it is not simply that of a space between the North Sea and the Rhine that Charles the Bold aspired to, but another much more prestigious and not as quixotic as one might have thought, in the Empire... But in Lorraine or Savoy either, there was no crown for dukes. Could this be a procession of losers? Why always this diatribe, focusing in this case on the fourth duke, when results were reaped, although they were not up to declared political ambitions?
Dumont also notes that the state building project did not stop with the death of Charles the Bold but continued until the early years of Charles of Habsburg. The role of Philip the Handsome in particular should not be forgotten.
 
Charles left his unmarried 19-year-old daughter Mary as his heir; clearly her marriage would have enormous implications for the political balance of Europe. Both King Louis of France and Frederick III, the Holy Roman Emperor, had unmarried eldest sons; Charles had already made some movements towards arranging a marriage between Mary and the Emperor's son, Maximilian, before his death.

Louis unwisely concentrated on seizing border territories militarily, in particular the Duchy of Burgundy (a French fiefdom). This naturally made negotiations for a marriage difficult. He later admitted to his councillor Philippe de Commynes that this had been his greatest mistake. In the meantime, the Habsburg Emperor moved faster and more purposefully, and secured the match for his son Maximilian with the aid of Mary's stepmother, Margaret. Maximilian idolized his father–in-law, even adopting Charles's motto J'ay emprins. His centralization policies later are usually considered continuation of Charles's work.

Due to this marriage, much of the Burgundian territories passed to the Holy Roman Empire. Throughout the early modern Wars of Religion and down to 1945, the border between the Holy Roman Empire and the kingdom of France, and later between France and Germany (specifically, concerning Alsace, Lorraine and Flanders), was disputed.

In literature
He is a main character in Sir Walter Scott's 1823 novel Quentin Durward. He is portrayed as intelligent, though brash. The timeline was manipulated by the author for dramatic purposes. He is a principal character in Scott's later novel Anne of Geierstein.

He is an important background character in The House of Niccolò series of historical novels by Dorothy Dunnett.

In film
 Yolanda (1924)
 Le Miracle des loups (1924)
 The entirely fictional hypothesis that he survived the Battle and was granted asylum in Pimlico is at the heart of the film Passport to Pimlico (1949).
 The Adventures of Quentin Durward (1955)
 Le Miracle des loups (1961)

Ancestors

Titles
  1433 – 5 January 1477: Count of Charolais as Charles I
  15 June 1467 – 5 January 1477: Duke of Burgundy as Charles I
  15 June 1467 – 5 January 1477: Duke of Lothier as Charles I
  15 June 1467 – 5 January 1477: Duke of Brabant as Charles I
  15 June 1467 – 5 January 1477: Duke of Limburg as Charles I
  15 June 1467 – 5 January 1477: Duke of Luxemburg as Charles II
  15 June 1467 – 5 January 1477: Count of Flanders as Charles II
  15 June 1467 – 5 January 1477: Count of Artois as Charles I
  15 June 1467 – 5 January 1477: Count Palatine of Burgundy as Charles I
  15 June 1467 – 5 January 1477: Count of Hainault as Charles I
  15 June 1467 – 5 January 1477: Count of Holland as Charles I
  15 June 1467 – 5 January 1477: Count of Zeeland as Charles I
  15 June 1467 – 5 January 1477: Count of Namur as Charles I
  15 June 1467 – 5 January 1477: Margrave of Antwerp as Charles I
  23 February 1473 – 5 January 1477: Duke of Guelders as Charles I
  23 February 1473 – 5 January 1477: Count of Zutphen as Charles I

See also

 Burgundian State
 Burgundian Netherlands
 Burgundian Wars
 Duchy of Burgundy
 Dukes of Burgundy family tree
 Jacques of Savoy, Count of Romont

Notes

References

Sources

Further reading
 Putnam, Ruth, Charles the Bold, Last Duke of Burgundy 1433–1477 (G. P. Putnam's Sons, 1908)

 .

External links
 

Charles
Nobility of the Burgundian Netherlands
Charles
1433 births
1477 deaths
Charles
People from Dijon
Charles
Charles
Charles
Charles
Charles
Charles
Charles
Charles
Charles
Charles
Charles
Charles
Charles
Charles
Military personnel killed in action
15th-century peers of France
15th-century monarchs in Europe
Royal reburials